Chinese water torture or a "dripping machine" is a mentally painful process in which cold water is slowly dripped onto the scalp, forehead or face for a prolonged period of time. The process causes fear and mental deterioration in the subject. The pattern of the drops is often irregular, and the cold sensation jarring, which causes anxiety as a person tries to anticipate the next drip. This form of torture was first described by Hippolytus De Marsiliis in Italy in the 15th or 16th century.

Origin
"Chinese water torture" is mentioned in the 1892 short story "The Compromiser" suggesting some public familiarity with the term by that date.  It may have been popularised by the predicament escape Chinese Water Torture Cell (a feat of escapology introduced in Berlin at Circus Busch on September 13, 1910). The escape entailed Harry Houdini being bound and suspended upside-down in a locked glass and steel cabinet full to overflowing with water, from which he escaped, together with the Fu Manchu stories of Sax Rohmer that were popular in the 1930s (in which Fu Manchu subjected his victims to various ingenious tortures, such as the wired jacket).

Hippolytus de Marsiliis is credited with the invention of a form of water torture. Having observed how drops of water falling one by one on a stone gradually created a hollow, he applied the method to the human body. Other suggestions say that the term "Chinese water torture" was invented merely to grant the method a sense of ominous mystery. The victim would be stripped of their clothes, shown to the public, then tortured. They would be driven insane while bystanders watched, mocked, and laughed at them.

The victims could see each drop coming and, after a long duration of time, were gradually driven frantic to the point of insanity, usually because they were led to believe that a hollow or severe ulcer would develop there, or as a (sometimes combined) result of prolonged restraint under irritating conditions, isolation, or the humiliation of being tortured publicly.

Effectiveness
There is very little evidence pertaining to the effectiveness of torture for interrogation purposes. The method itself causes lasting mental damage in victims proportional to the intensity of exposure. The television series MythBusters investigated the effectiveness of Chinese water torture, and while it was found quite effective, they noted that the restraining equipment was providing most of the effect by itself, and when testing the dripping water alone on a relaxed, unrestrained subject, it was found almost negligible. Nevertheless, in the Episode 3, Season 2 of the web television series Mind Field the MythBusters host Adam Savage said the following: "The creepiest thing that happened after we did this episode was that I got an email from someone from a throw away account. He said, 'We found that randomizing when the drops occurred was incredibly effective. That anything that happens on a regular periodicity can become a type of meditation, and you can then tune it out. If you couldn't predict it, he said, 'We found, we were able to induce a psychotic break within 20 hours.'" In addition to the victims experiencing mental deterioration, psychosis is a common side effect when undergoing the Chinese Water Torture. During the psychosis episode, victims experience delusions, hallucinations, and losing touch with reality. In 2012, Australian artist, Lottie Consalvo, performed the Chinese Water Torture for an art project, Steer a Steady Ship, to represent her emotions after her sister's passing. Whilst lying under the drips of water, she felt the presence of her deceased sister lying beside her. In the article, Australian Artist Recreates Chinese Water Torture, that explains Consalvo's experience during the performance, the author states, ‘She came to the idea of Chinese water torture, which can cause psychosis, through its association with the head, which for her represents the physicality of the mind - something she believes is "more physical than anything in life.”

See also
Corporal punishment
Insanity
Water cure
 Water torture

References

Physical torture techniques
Psychological torture techniques
Water torture